Major Anderson may refer to:

 Robert Anderson (Civil War) (June 14, 1805 – October 26, 1871), an American Military leader and the commander of Fort Sumter during the Battle of Fort Sumter
 Rudolf Anderson (15 September 1927 – 27 October 1962), a pilot and officer in the United States Air Force
 A minor character from the Ender's Game novel series